The CASA C-212 Aviocar is a turboprop-powered STOL medium cargo aircraft designed and built by the Spanish aircraft manufacturer Construcciones Aeronáuticas SA (CASA). It is designed for use by both civil and military operators.

The C-212 was developed during the 1960s in response to the Spanish Air Force's need to replace much of its transport aircraft fleet and was designed to perform numerous roles, including ambulance aircraft, paratroop carrier, and utility transport. The first prototype made its maiden flight on 26 March 1971, and an order was secured from the Spanish Air Force three years thereafter. Several other customers emerged, initially from the military sector but, due to the interest of civilian airliners, CASA developed a dedicated civil version of the C-212 as well. Production of the type at the Seville facility would continue for 40 years, with 483 aircraft produced.

Indonesia emerged as a key early customer for the C-212. During 1975, the Indonesian aircraft company IPTN successfully secured the rights to license-produce the aircraft in Bandung, Indonesia. CASA assisted the establishment of a production line there that, by 2000, had constructed a total of 95 NC-212s. The majority of Indonesian-built aircraft were sold to domestic customers, although some exports were also recorded in the Asian market. During February 2013, it was announced that Airbus (the successor company to CASA) had agreed terms with PTDI (IPTN's successor) to fully transfer production of the C-212 to Indonesia. For a time, PTDI produced both the NC-212-200 and the -400 upgrade, which were equipped with new digital avionics and autopilot, and featured a redesigned cabin that could accommodate up to 28 passengers.

By December 2012, there were 92 operators of the C-212 around the world. These operators included numerous charter and short-haul aviation companies as well as various national air services, which commonly used as a transport, surveillance aircraft, and for search and rescue. The C-212 has been a popular aircraft among skydivers and smokejumpers due to its uncommon rear ramp arrangement amongst its competitors. In particular, the Australian airline Skytraders has used a number of C-212s to support Australian scientific research teams across Antarctica and the Southern Ocean.

Development
During the late 1960s, the Spanish Air Force was operating a number of outdated piston-engined transports, including the three-engined Junkers Ju 52 and two-engined Douglas C-47. Seeking to fulfil the Spanish Air Force's needs to modernise its transport force, the Spanish aircraft manufacturer Construcciones Aeronáuticas SA (CASA) developed a proposed aircraft, designated C-212. This was a twin-engined 18-seat transport aircraft that would be capable of performing in a variety of military roles, including passenger transport, ambulance aircraft and paratroop carrier, while also being suitable for use by civil operators. On 26 March 1971, the first prototype conducted its maiden flight. During 1974, the Spanish Air Force decided to purchase the C-212, which had acquired the name Aviocar, in order to update its fleet.

Several airlines expressed interest in the type, particularly in light of its success with military operators, thus CASA decided to pursue development of a dedicated commercial version of the C-212. During July 1975, the first examples of which was delivered. During 1997, the improved -400 model was introduced, featuring a glass cockpit and more powerful Honeywell TPE331 engines. By August 2006, a total of 30 CASA-built C-212s of all variants reportedly remained in airline service with various operators around the world.

During July 2010, Domingo Urena-Raso, CEO of Airbus Military, stated that the company could no longer afford to produce the C-212 in Europe. Production of the type at Airbus' Seville facility was progressively slowed to only four aircraft in two years. During December 2012, the final Spanish-assembled C-212 was delivered to its end customer, the Vietnam Coast Guard. By the time of the line's shutdown, 477 aircraft have been produced for 92 operators.

Indonesian production 
During 1975, the Indonesian aircraft company IPTN successfully negotiated terms with CASA to produce up to 108 C-212s under license in Indonesia. Accordingly, IPTN and Nurtanio became involved in the manufacturing of their own C-212s, with assembly being performed at IPTN's facility in Bandung, Indonesia. CASA provided technical assistance in establishing their production line, sending a delegation of technicians to Bandung to train local personnel; the relative simplicity of the C-212's design was credited with greatly aiding this process.

Under the terms of the license, IPTN was permitted to sell the aircraft throughout the Asian market. Despite this, the majority of Indonesian-made NC-212s were typically sold to domestic customers; by 1986, only six aircraft had reportedly been exported. By 2000, a total of 95 NC-212s has been completed. By this point, production of the type had become a secondary priority to other ventures, such as the larger CASA/IPTN CN-235. IPTN also undertook development of more advanced versions of the aircraft. Between 2004 and 2008, all of the jigs and fixtures necessary to produce the NC212-400 were supplied by Airbus and installed at Bandung, enabling Indonesia to become the single-source manufacturer of this model. An extension to the licensing agreement was also made in 2006.

During July 2011, Airbus announced an agreement to strategically collaborate with PTDI (IPTN's successor) on the C-212. Under the terms of this agreement, Airbus undertook an 18-month first phase of support to PTDI, after which it stated it would provide PTDI an increasing high-value industrial activity, including C-212 upgrades and production transference. In February 2013, the arrangement between the two companies was formally extended to transfer production of the C-212 to Indonesia. For a time, PTDI produced both the NC-212-200 and the -400 upgrade, which were equipped with new digital avionics and autopilot, and featured a redesigned cabin that could accommodate up to 28 passengers. During 2014, PTDI stopped producing the -400 series in favour of focusing on the improved NC-212i model.

Design

The CASA C-212 Aviocar is a turboprop-powered STOL-capable cargo aircraft. In terms of its basic configuration, it has a high-mounted wing, a boxy fuselage, and a conventional tail. The C-212 has been designed to operate in austere environments for extended periods without ground support apparatus. Features such as its STOL performance and rugged landing gear fitted with low-pressure tyres enables it to operate from unpaved fields and under hot-and-high conditions. For greater simplicity, the aircraft's tricycle undercarriage is non-retractable.

Dependent on configuration, the cabin of the C-212 has a maximum occupancy of between 21 and 28 passengers. In a paratroop configuration, up to 24 paratroopers along with one jumpmaster can be accommodated on foldable sidewall seats, while in a mixed configuration, up to ten soldiers and a single vehicle can be transported. Since the C-212 does not have a pressurized fuselage, it is limited to relatively low-flight-level airline usage (below  MSL), and is thus orientated for operations performing short legs and regional airline services.

Operational history

During 2013, it was reported that 290 C-212s were flying in 40 countries; Indonesia was the country with the most aircraft of the type, operating 70. It has seen especially wide employment as a commuter airliner and a military aircraft, with its operators including numerous charter and short-haul aviation companies and several national air forces. The C-212 is commonly used as a transport, surveillance aircraft, and for search and rescue.

The C-212 has also been in the service of the United States Army Special Operations Command, where it is operated under the designation C-41A and is commonly used for operations such as troop infiltration and exfiltration, supply drops, and airborne operations. During August 2010, Airbus Military received a contract for the sustainment and modernisation of five C-212-200s operated by the US Army Special Operations Aviation Command (USASOAC). Additional aircraft were both owned and operated by the private military contractor Blackwater; these were active during both the Iraq War and the War in Afghanistan, typically to conduct supply drops to US ground forces active in remote areas of these countries. During the conflict, the planes were piloted by former pilots from 160th "Night Stalkers" Special Operations Regiment.

One particularly ambitious use of the C-212 was undertaken by the Australian airline Skytraders, which has used its fleet to support Australia’s scientific research assets across Antarctica and the Southern Ocean. Various operators have elected to operate their aircraft amongst inhospitable terrain, such as desert and jungles. On account of its uncommon rear ramp arrangement, the C-212 has a unique selling point amongst its competitors; thus, it became a popular aircraft among skydivers and smokejumpers.

Variants

Series 100

C-212A Original military production version. Also known as C-212-5, C-212-5 series 100M, and by the Spanish Air Force as the T-12B and D-3A (for medevac aircraft), 129 built.
C-212AV VIP transport version, T-12C.
C-212B Six pre-production C-212As converted for photo-reconnaissance missions, TR-12A.
C-212C Original civil version
C-212D Two pre-production C-212As converted for use as navigational trainers, TE-12B.
NC-212-100 Manufactured under licence in Indonesia since 1976, IPTN produced 28 NC-212-100s before switching to NC-212-200.

Series 200

Stretched version with updated engines (Honeywell TPE331-10R-511C or −512C, rated at 900 shp (671 kW) each), introduced in 1979. The CASA C-212-200 is also a popular skydiving aircraft, known for its large capacity, fast climb, and large tailgate exit ramp.
C-212 series 200M Military version known as T-12D in Spanish service and Tp 89 for the Swedish Air Force. Specialised ASW and maritime patrol aircraft have been built from this version.
NC-212-200 C-212-200 built under licence by IPTN.
NC-212-200 MPA  C-212-200 built under licence by IPTN, designed as a Maritime Patrol Aircraft

Series 300
Standard production version from 1987 on. Engines were Honeywell TPE331-10R-513C, also rated at  continuous (925 shp maximum). The propellers were changed from four-bladed Hartzell composite blade propellers to four-bladed Dowty-Rotol all-metal propellers. Winglets and a larger vertical stabilizer area provide improved performance, and the addition of a nose baggage compartment gives the nose a more streamlined look than the Series 200. Various systems have been incrementally upgraded, including the addition of an integrated autopilot system.
C-212-M series 300 (Series 300M) Military version.
C-212 series 300 airliner 26 seat regional airliner.
C-212 series 300 utility 23 seat civil utility version.
C-212 series 300P Civil utility version with Pratt & Whitney Canada PT6A-65 engines

Series 400
Upgraded version with  TPE331-12JR-701C engines, increased payload and upgraded avionics moved from under the floor to the nose. First flew 4 April 1997, replacing Series 300 in production from 1998. The C-212-400 received Spanish certification in 1998. Between 2004 and 2008, production jigs and fixtures for the NC-212-400 were relocated to Bandung from San Pablo, Spain, and PTDI became the sole manufacturer of the NC-212 family. In 2014, NC-212-200 and NC-212-400 production ended and production moved to the improved NC-212i version.

NC-212i 
The rotor is four-bladed Dowty Rotol R334/4-82-F/13 constant speed propeller with a 2.75 m (110-inch) diameter.

Operators

Civil operators

 Australian Antarctic Division

 B&H Airlines – former operator

 Indonesian National Police
 Merpati Nusantara Airlines
 Nusantara Buana Air (NBA)
 Pelita Air
 Sabang Merauke Raya Air Charter – former operator

 Sevenair - six former Portuguese Air Force aircraft bought in 2018

 Air Miami
 Bar Harbor Airlines
 Bighorn Airways
 Boston-Maine Airways – operating code share service as Pan Am Express on behalf of Pan Am
 Chaparral Airlines – operating code share service as American Eagle on behalf of American Airlines
 Coastal Airlines
 Evergreen International Airlines
 Executive Airlines – operating code share service as American Eagle in the Caribbean from San Juan, PR (SJU) on behalf of American Airlines
 Fischer Brothers Aviation – operating code share service as Northwest Airlink on behalf of Northwest Airlines and also operating code share service as Allegheny Commuter
 Gulf Air – operating code share service as Air Florida Commuter on behalf of Air Florida
 Inland Empire Airways
 Jet Express – operating code share service as Trans World Express (TWE) on behalf of Trans World Airlines (TWA)
 Mountain Air Cargo
 North American Airlines
 Oceanair
 Presidential Airways – Owned and operated by the private military contractor Blackwater.
 Prinair
 U.S. Drug Enforcement Administration
 Bering Air
 Ryan Air Services

Military operators

 Abu Dhabi Air Force – four delivered 1982

 Angolan Air Force - twelve aircraft ordered in 1985; eight delivered that same year, and the remaining four in 1986. Two aircraft operational as of December 2021.

 Argentine Coast Guard – five delivered 1988–1990
 Argentine Army Aviation – Three C-212

 Australian Army - Two Skytraders leased C-212-400 for ADF Parachuting School.

 Bolivian Air Force – one delivered 1989
 Bolivian Army

 Bophuthatswana Air Force – one delivered 1985, to South African Air Force.

 Botswana Defence Force Air Wing - three in service as of December 2021

 Chadian Air Force – two delivered in 1988

 Chilean Air Force – six delivered 1978, three in service as of 2015.
 Chilean Army – former Spanish Air Force aircraft. C-212-100s being phased out and put up for sale. Two in service as of December 2015.
 Chilean Navy – four delivered 1978

 Colombian Air Force - four in service as of December 2021
 National Army of Colombia - three in service as of December 2021
 Colombian Navy
 SATENA – nine delivered 1984–1989

 Djibouti Air Force

 Dominican Republic Air Force - Received three CASA 212-400s 200–2001. All three remain in service as of December 2021

 Ecuadorian Army - one in service as of December 2021

 Equatorial Guinea Air Force

 French Air Force – five delivered 1988

 Indonesian Army - six in service as of December 2021
 Indonesian Navy - fourteen in service as of December 2021, with six in a maritime patrol aircraft configuration
 Indonesian Air Force - ten aircraft in service as of December 2021, with eight currently on order.

 Royal Jordanian Air Force – four delivered 1975–1976, with two attrition replacement aircraft delivered 1983–84 and a further, surveillance-configured example purchased in 1985. One operational 2015.

 Lesotho Defence Force – 2 aircraft operational as of December 2021

 Air Wing of the Armed Forces of Malta – The Air Wing operated a single example in 2009.

 Mexican Navy – 7 active as of December 2021

 Nicaraguan Air Force – four delivered 1977–1978

 National Aeronaval Service – six delivered 1982–1988. 3 aircraft operational as of December 2021

 Paraguayan Air Force – four C.212-200 delivered 1984 and one C.212–400 delivered in 2003. 3 aircraft operational as of December 2021

 Philippine Air Force - two NC212i delivered in 2018. Both of them are operational as of December 2021

 Portuguese Air Force – 24 delivered between 1974 and 1976. Retired in 2011, replaced by EADS CASA C-295.

 Senegalese Air Force - two C212 maritime patrol aircraft on order

 South African Air Force - two C212 operational as of December 2021

 Spanish Air and Space Force – 80 delivered between 1974 and 1984, with eleven still operational as of December 2021

 Surinam Air Force – two delivered in 1999, one is a C.212-400MPA. Both sold to Botswana Defence Force via Fayard Enterprise.

 Swedish Navy – one delivered in 1986

 Royal Thai Army - two operational as of December 2021

 Transkei Defence Force – two delivered in 1986; passed on to the South African Air Force.

 United States Air Force – as C-41A.
 United States Army

 Uruguayan Air Force – five delivered 1981–1982; all of them are still operational as of December 2021.

 Venda Defence Force to South African Air Force.

 Venezuelan Navy - five aircraft operational as of December 2021

 Vietnam People's Air Force - three NC-212i has been commissioned by December 2021
 Vietnam Coast Guard – two C-212–400

 Air Force of Zimbabwe – nine operational as of December 2021

Incidents and accidents
As of September 2011, CASA C-212s have been involved in 71 hull-loss incidents with a total of 558 fatalities.
2 January 1984 A Royal Jordanian Air Force CASA 212-A3 Aviocar 100 crashed near Al Qatrana/Jordan due to mechanical problems. All 13 people on board the plane were killed.
4 March 1987 Northwest Airlink Flight 2268 crashed while landing at Detroit Metropolitan Wayne County Airport in Romulus, Michigan. Nine of the 19 passengers and crew on board were killed.
8 May 1987 American Eagle Flight 5452 crashed while landing in Puerto Rico, killing two.
2 August 1988 Operated by Geoterrex of Ottawa, Ontario, Canada, the aircraft crashed on approach to Reykjavik, Iceland with the loss of all 3 people on board. The cause was, "the crew lost control of the aircraft most probably because of large fluctuations in the power output of the right engine caused by the shift of an incorrectly installed speeder spring in the right propeller governor."
1 December 1989 A United States Army C-212-200 crashed into the Patuxent River while trying to land at the Naval Air Test Center, Patuxent River, Maryland, killing all five people on board.
16 January 1990 SANSA Flight 32 crashed into the Cerro Cedral, a mountain in Costa Rica shortly after takeoff from Juan Santamaria International Airport in San Jose. All 20 passengers and three crew on board died in the crash.
24 January 1990 A Venezuelan Navy C-212 crashed into a mountain due to poor weather, killing all 24 people on board.
27 March 1990 An Angolan government C-212 was shot down by UNITA rebels near Kuito, killing all 25 people on board.
7 June 1992 American Eagle Flight 5456, a CASA C-212 flying from Fernando Luis Ribas Dominicci Airport in San Juan, Puerto Rico crashed short of the runway in Mayagüez, killing both crew members and all three passengers. The investigation led to the discontinuation of use of the C-212 by American Eagle.
8 March 1994 A Spanish Air Force C-212, part of the Ala 37 deployed in Vicenza, Italy, was hit in the tail by a Serbian SA-7 missile east of Rijeka when ferrying UNPROFOR personnel from Sarajevo. The tail control surfaces were damaged, the left engine failed and four passengers were injured by splinters. The crew managed to land the aircraft at Rijeka Airport. Spanish technicians were able to repair the damage and have the aircraft back in service in 48 hours.
27 August 1994 A DEA-operated aircraft (reg. N119CA) crashed into a mountain (or at the end of a box canyon) north of Puerto Pizana, in the Amazonian jungle department of San Martín, Peru. The crash happened while on flight from Santa Lucia to Pucallpa in the Huallaga River Valley region, and killed the CASA's five occupants, which were all DEA Special Agents. The accident reportedly took place under bad weather and low visibility conditions during a counter-narcotics reconnaissance operation. This accident precipitated the end of Operation Snowcap, under which the ill-fated flight took place.
17 June 1995 An Angolan Air Force C-212 carrying members of a local football club crashed while on approach to Catumbela Airport, killing 48 of the 53 people aboard.
27 November 2004 "Blackwater 61" Presidential Airways CASA C-212-200 (registration: N960BW / serial nr: 231) was contracted by the U.S. Department of Defense to supply American forces deployed in remote areas of Afghanistan.
22 February 2005 An Indonesian National Police C-212 received engine trouble during landing, causing it to crash into the sea. Of the 18 police officers on board, 15 were killed.
26 October 2006 Swedish Coast Guard CASA C-212-200 (registration: SE-IVF/serial nr: KBV 585) crashed in the Falsterbo Canal during a surveillance mission, killing all four on board. Eyewitness accounts suggest that the accident was caused by one of the wings of the aircraft somehow detaching. The preliminary report from the Swedish Accident Investigation Board suggests that the right wing detached due to a fatigue crack which had developed in the load-bearing structure in the wing.

15 November 2006 Mexican Navy CASA 212-200 Maritime Patrol (serial AMP-114) crashed in the sea in Campeche coast over the Mexican Gulf during a surveillance mission, all crew managed to survive, due to a smooth maneuver, reasons of the accident still unknown.
An air force spokesman said it was assumed it had crashed.
9 October 2009 Uruguayan Air Force CASA C-212 FAU-531, being operated as part of the United Nations Stabilization Mission in Haiti crashed west of Fonds-Verettes killing all 11 on board.
19 June 2010 a Cameroon Aero Service CASA C-212 chartered by Sundance Resources crashed in dense jungle after departing Cameroon for Congo, killing all 11 people on board, including Australian mining magnate Ken Talbot and Sundance personnel, Chairman Geoff Wedlock, Chief Executive Officer Don Lewis, company secretary John Carr-Gregg and non-executive directors John Jones and Craig Oliver. At the time of the accident, Talbot was a director of Sundance and its largest shareholder.
12 February 2011 Sabang Merauke Raya Air Charter CASA C-212, PK-ZAI, carrying five crew, crashed after takeoff from Batam, Indonesia, during a test flight following engine maintenance. All five crew members were killed.
1 April 2011  FUGRO Aviation Canada Limited CASA C-212, C-FDKM, carrying three crew, crashed while attempting to land at Saskatoon Airport, Saskatoon, Saskatchewan, Canada, after declaring an emergency with an engine failure. The aircraft crashed on Wanuskewin Drive in Saskatoon and hit a concrete barrier, resulting in one person being killed and two injured.
2 September 2011 A Chilean Air Force CASA C-212, carrying 21 people, crashed  from Chile's Pacific coastline in the Juan Fernández Islands, with no survivors. Felipe Camiroaga, a highly popular Chilean TV presenter, was one of those on board the aircraft. Also on board was businessman Felipe Cubillos, who had been working on post-earthquake reconstruction efforts.
29 September 2011 An Indonesian Aerospace CASA C-212, registration PK-TLF, built in 1989, carrying 18 people (14 passengers, three crew and the pilot) on a flight between Medan, North Sumatra and Kutacane, Aceh operated by Nusantara Buana Air crashed into Gunung Kapur, a  mountain in the Bukit Barisan mountain range, a 10 km walk from the village of Bukit Lawang in Bohorok district Gunung Leuser National Park. There were no survivors. The accident occurred between 07.28 and 08.05 local time about 58 km (36 miles) northwest of Medan, North Sumatra.
16 June 2016 A CASA C-212-400 of the Vietnam Coast Guard from Gia Lam Airport en route to the Gulf of Tonkin went missing and was presumed crashed during a search for a downed Su-30MK2 and its pilots a few days before. By 18 June 2016, some debris was found, but there was no sign of the crew. All nine crew members were lost.
9 February 2017 A Botswana Defence Force CASA C-212 crashed in the general area of Thebephatshwa village in the evening, minutes after leaving the Thebephatshwa Air Base. All three people on board died in the crash.
29 July 2022The pilot of a CASA C-212 successfully landed at Raleigh–Durham International Airport after the loss of the right landing gear wheel during a hard landing after flying skydivers. The aircraft experienced a runway excursion on touchdown at Raleigh-Durham, ending up on the grass infield. The flight began from a private grass strip southwest of the airport with the pilot and copilot on board, with the hard landing occurring with the copilot at the controls. The pilot reported that the copilot jumped from the aircraft's rear ramp at  without a parachute,  from the airport. The body of the 23-year old male copilot was found in a residential back garden later that evening, not far from the flightpath in nearby Fuquay-Varina, North Carolina.

Specifications (Series 400)

See also

References

Citations

Bibliography

 Barrie, Douglas and Jenny Pite. "World's Air Forces". Flight International, Vol. 146, No. 4435, 24– 30 August 1994, pp. 29–64.
 Eastwood, Tony and John Roach. Turbo Prop Airliner Production List. London: The Aviation Hobby Shop, 1990. .
 
 Hoyle, Craig. "Directory: World Air Forces". Flight International, Vol. 178, No. 5257, 14– 20 December 2010, pp. 26–53.
 Hoyle, Craig. "World Air Forces Directory". Flight International, Vol. 180, No. 5321, 13– 19 December 2011, pp. 26–52.
 Hoyle, Craig. "World Air Forces Directory". Flight International, Vol. 182, No. 5370, 11– 17 December 2012. pp. 40–64. ISSN 0015-3710.
 Hoyle, Craig. "World Air Forces Directory". Flight International, Vol. 188, No. 5517, 8–14 December 2015. pp. 26–53.
 
 Jackson, Paul. Jane's All The World's Aircraft 2003–2004. Coulsdon, UK: Jane's Information Group, 2003. .
 Jackson, Paul. "Royal Jordanian Air Force: Air Power at Three-continent Crossroads". Air International, Vol. 33, No. 5, November 1987, pp. 215–223. .
 
 Simpson, Rod. "CASA C-212 Aviocar: A Plane For All Seasons". Air International, Vol. 68, No. 1, January 2005, pp. 32–38. .
 Taylor, John W. R. Jane's All The World's Aircraft 1988–89. Coulsdon, UK: Jane's Defence Data, 1988. .
 Vértesy D. "Interrupted Innovation: Emerging economies in the structure of the global aerospace industry." Datawyse / Universitaire Pers Maastricht. 1 January 2011. https://doi.org/10.26481/dis.20110930dv.
 "World's Air Forces". Flight International, Vol. 144, No. 4397, November 1993, pp. 41–76. 24–30.

External links

 
 

CASA aircraft
1970s Spanish civil utility aircraft
1970s Spanish military transport aircraft
Aircraft first flown in 1971
Twin-turboprop tractor aircraft
High-wing aircraft
Indonesia–Spain relations